Albertus Magnus College is a private Catholic university in New Haven, Connecticut. Founded by the Dominican Sisters of St. Mary of the Springs (now Dominican Sisters of Peace), it is located in the Prospect Hill neighborhood of New Haven, near the border with Hamden.

History

Albertus Magnus College was founded in 1925 by the Dominican Sisters of St. Mary of the Springs. The dedication speaker was James Rowland Angell, the president of nearby Yale University. All classes and offices were first housed in Rosary Hall, a Palladian-style mansion that has since been converted for use as the institution's main library. The college's first chaplain, Rev. Artur Chandler, stated that the college's initial goal was to educate women "to become thinkers and leaders and the noble among the ladyhood of the future."

By 1940 the campus had expanded to its current 50 acre size and absorbed a variety of surrounding gilded-era mansions for use as dormitories and office space. The school became known for its strict liberal arts curriculum that required four years of Latin or Greek study.

Originally a women's college, the institution became coeducational in 1985 to some controversy, led by its longtime president Julia M. McNamara.  Albertus Magnus College was the last Connecticut college to go co-ed. The 1980s also brought a series of construction projects to the campus, including new classroom space and a new athletic center. The first graduate program, a Master of Arts in Liberal Studies, was offered in 1992.

Organization

Albertus Magnus is presided over by a board of trustees. A 1968 reorganization of this leadership opened 80% of spots to secular personnel while continuing to reserve 20% for members of the Dominican Sisters of Peace.

Academics
In addition to undergraduate majors, minors and concentrations, including pre-professional preparation, there are graduate programs in art therapy, mental health counseling, addiction counseling, leadership, liberal studies, fine arts in creative writing, human services, business administration, education, and management and organizational leadership.

As of 2022, the university has a 100% acceptance rate with a student body that is 15% male and 85% female.

Campus

The campus is located about two miles (2 km) from the central campus of Yale University in a residential area known as Prospect Hill near the border with Hamden. The neighborhood is on Prospect Street just above Edgerton Park and near East Rock.

The college uses several of the area's historic 19th century mansions as residence hall and administrative building. A number of these are contributing properties of the Prospect Hill Historic District.

Athletics
Albertus Magnus College teams participate as a member of the National Collegiate Athletic Association's Division III. The Falcons are a member of the Great Northeast Athletic Conference (GNC). Men's sports include baseball, basketball, golf, ice hockey, soccer, tennis and swimming & diving; while women's sports include basketball, field hockey, lacrosse, soccer, softball, swimming & diving, tennis and volleyball.

Notable people

Alumni
 Ellen Bree Burns, U.S. federal judge 
 Margaret Heckler, Member of the U.S. House of Representatives, Massachusetts (1967–1983), 15th United States Secretary of Health and Human Services, 19th United States Ambassador to Ireland 
 Jacqueline Noonan, pediatric cardiologist; described Noonan syndrome and hypoplastic left heart syndrome
 Dianne Pinderhughes, American Political Scientist
 Lauren DeStefano, Author
 Margaret L. Drugovich, medical researcher
 Marilyn Travinsky, politician

Faculty
 Marcella Boveri, biologist
 Lawrence J. DeNardis, U.S. Congressman and University of New Haven president
 Alice Mattison, novelist and short story writer
 Dorothea Rudnick, biologist
 Suzanne W. Tourtellotte, astronomer
 Grace Evelyn Pickford, biologist
 Nuala Archer, poet

References

External links
 
 Official website

 
Education in New Haven, Connecticut
Dominican universities and colleges in the United States
Former women's universities and colleges in the United States
Educational institutions established in 1925
Association of Catholic Colleges and Universities
Buildings and structures in New Haven, Connecticut
Universities and colleges in New Haven County, Connecticut
Catholic universities and colleges in Connecticut
1925 establishments in Connecticut